The 2013–14 LEB Plata season is the 13th season of the LEB Plata, the Spanish basketball third division. It is named Adecco Plata as its sponsored identity. The champion of the regular season will be promoted to LEB Oro. The teams between second and ninth position will play a best of five games play off, where the winner will be promoted too to the higher division.

Competition format

Eligibility of players
All teams must have in their roster:
A minimum of seven players who played in Spain during three season being between 15 and 20 years old.
A maximum of two non-EU players. This players can be replaced by players from the EU or ACP countries.
A maximum of two players from the EU or ACP countries.

Regular season
Each team of every division has to play with all the other teams of its division twice, once at home and the other at the opponent's stadium.

Like many other leagues in continental Europe, the Liga LEB takes a winter break once each team has played half its schedule. One feature of the league that may be unusual to North American observers is that the two halves of the season are played in the same order—that is, the order of each team's first-half fixtures is repeated in the second half of the season, with the only difference being the arenas used. This procedure is typical in Europe; it is also used by La Liga in football.

Since the first round of the second leg, if two or more teams have accumulated the same number of winning games, the criteria of tie-breaking are these:
Head-to-head winning games.
Head-to-head points coefficient.
Total points coefficient.

After the first leg of the season, the two top qualified teams will play the Copa Príncipe de Asturias and the leader will be the host team.

At the final of the season:
The regular season winner promotes directly to LEB Oro.
Teams qualified between 2nd and 9th, will join the promotion play-offs.
Team qualified in last position is relegated directly to Liga EBA.

Team information and location
New teams in the league
Cáceres Patrimonio de la Humanidad (resigned to LEB Oro)
Conservas de Cambados (Liga EBA champion)
Zornotza ST (promoted from Liga EBA)
Marín Peixegalego (achieved a vacant berth)
Fundación Baloncesto Fuenlabrada (achieved a vacant berth)

Teams that left the league
Unión Financiera Baloncesto Oviedo (promoted to LEB Oro)
Clínicas Rincón (achieved a vacant berth in LEB Oro)
Gran Canaria 2014 B (relegated to Liga EBA)

Regular season

League table

|}
(C): indicates Copa LEB Plata champion.

Playoffs

Copa LEB Plata
At the half of the league, the two first teams in the table play the Copa LEB Plata at home of the winner of the first half season (13th round). If this team doesn't want to host the Copa LEB Plata, the second qualified can do it. If nobody wants to host it, the Federation will propose a neutral venue.

The Champion of this Cup will play the play-offs as first qualified if it finishes the league between the 2nd and the 5th qualified.

Teams qualified

|}

The game

Awards and trophies

MVP week by week

See also
2013–14 LEB Oro season
2013–14 Liga EBA season

References

External links
Official website

LEB Plata seasons
LEB3